Eileen Chong (born 1980) is an Australian contemporary poet.

Early life and education 
Chong was born in 1980, in Singapore of Hakka, Hokkien, and Peranakan descent. She grew up speaking English, Mandarin and Hokkien. Chong studied English language and literature at the National Institute of Education in Singapore and taught literature in secondary schools.

She migrated to Sydney, Australia in 2007.  After moving to Sydney she undertook a Masters of Letters at the University of Sydney.  After taking a poetry class with Judith Beveridge, she started writing poetry in earnest in 2009.

Career 
Chong was awarded the Poets Union Youth Fellowship in 2010.

In 2011-12, Chong was an Australian Poetry Fellow, which led to the publication of her first book Burning Rice.

Chong was the poet-in-residence at the Royal Botanic Garden Sydney and the Bundanon Trust in 2016.

Chong’s first book, Burning Rice, is on the New South Wales’ Higher School Certificate syllabus for English Extension from 2019-2023. This book was the first poetry collection by an Asian-Australian poet to be on the New South Wales’ English syllabus for the Higher School Certificate from 2019-2023. Chong’s poem, ‘My Hakka Grandmother’, is part of a suite of poems from Contemporary Asian Australian Poets on the NSW HSC syllabus for English, 2019-2023.

Eileen Chong reflected on her upbringing and its influence on themes in her writing:"To paraphrase Wittgenstein, the limits of the world I grew up in were very much defined by the language of food. Ancestor worship and veneration centred around food offerings; my grandparents and parents certainly never told me they loved me when I was growing up, but they would ask if I was hungry, and they would do whatever it took to feed me, and they fed me well."

Selected bibliography

 The Uncommon Feast (single-author essays, poems, and recipes) (2018) Introduction by Judith Beveridge, illustrations by Colin Cassidy. Recent Work Press, Canberra, Australia.

Poetry Collections 

 Burning Rice (2012) Australian Poetry New Voices Series 2012, Melbourne, Australia. Reprinted 2013. Pitt Street Poetry, Sydney, Australia.
 Peony (2014) Pitt Street Poetry, Sydney, Australia.
 Painting Red Orchids (2016) Pitt Street Poetry, Sydney, Australia.
 Another Language (2017) Foreword by Paul Kane; George Braziller, New York City, USA
 Rainforest (2018) Pitt Street Poetry, Sydney, Australia.
 Map-Making (2018), Photographs by Charlene Winfred; Potts Point Press, Sydney, Australia.
 Dark Matter (2018) International Poetry Studies Institute, with Recent Work Press, Canberra, Australia.
 A Thousand Crimson Blooms (2021) University of Queensland Press, Brisbane, Australia.

Anthologies

Awards 
In 2017 Chong's collection Painting Red Orchids was shortlisted for the 2017 Prime Minister's Literary Awards (Poetry).

In 2019 her collection Rainforest (Pitt Street Poetry) was shortlisted for the NSW Premier's Literary Awards, Multicultural Award.

References

External links
Official website
Interview with Chong at Djed Press
Chong's poems at Glasgow Review of Books
Eileen Chong on beauty and truth: a poetics of resistance at Writing NSW

Singaporean people of Hakka descent
Australian people of Chinese descent
Australian poets
1980 births
University of Sydney alumni
Living people
Singaporean emigrants to Australia